John Ryle may refer to:

 John Ryle (fl. 1414), Member of Parliament for Lincoln in 1414
 John Ryle (politician) (1781–1862), Member of Parliament for Macclesfield from 1832 to 1837 
 J. C. Ryle (John Charles Ryle, 1816–1900), Anglican bishop of Liverpool
 John Ryle (manufacturer) (1817–1887), British and American businessman in the silk industry
 John Ryle (professor) (1889–1950), British medical professor
 John Ryle (writer) (born 1952), British author and anthropologist